Mouse Trap Hotel is an action video game for the Nintendo Game Boy. It is loosely based on Milton Bradley's board game Mouse Trap.

Summary

The object of this game is to take Maxie the Mouse as he tries to visit his girlfriend. Unfortunately, she is located in a penthouse while Maxie dwells in the basement. By finding the exit in each level, he draws closer to being with his girlfriend. Side-scrolling segments with some vertical elements are an expected part of the game. Getting hit by mousetraps and enemies causes Maxie to lose his energy. As expected with most platform games, getting hit too frequently causes the player to lose a life. Maxie's tail comes in handy when it comes to destroying enemies.

Each floor has its own obstacles; which range from mattress springs in the bedroom to dancing legs at the ballroom. Players must ride an elevator to each new floor where dangers constantly lurk about in places like the kitchen and the gymnasium.

Reception

References

1992 video games
Electro Brain games
Game Boy games
Game Boy-only games
Imagineering (company) games
North America-exclusive video games
Platform games
Side-scrolling video games
Video games about mice and rats
Video games developed in the United States
Video games scored by Mark Van Hecke
Video games set in hotels
Single-player video games